Tsao Chan is a crater on Mercury. Its name was adopted by the International Astronomical Union (IAU) in 1976, for the Chinese writer Tsao Chan.

Tsao Chan is to the southwest of the larger crater Mark Twain.

References

Impact craters on Mercury